Lytvynenko is a surname of Ukrainian origin. It is sometimes transliterated as Litvinenko. It may refer to:

 Bohdan Lytvynenko (born 2003), Ukrainian footballer
 Dmytro Lytvynenko (born 1987), Ukrainian futsal player
 Ivan Lytvynenko (born 2001), Ukrainian footballer
 Leonid Lytvynenko (born 1949), Ukrainian decathlete
 Oleksandr Lytvynenko (1977–2008), Ukrainian sprint canoeist
 Vasyl Lytvynenko (born 1991), Ukrainian footballer
 Vitaliy Lytvynenko (born 1970), Ukrainian ice hockey player
 Vitaliy Viktorovych Lytvynenko (born 1985), Ukrainian politician
 Yulia Lytvynenko (born 1976), Ukrainian politician

See also
 
 18120 Lytvynenko, minor planet
 Litvinenko
 Lytvyn

Ukrainian-language surnames